Karl Hurter (born 12 February 1964) is a South African former cricket umpire. He stood in four ODI games between 2002 and 2006 and one Twenty20 International in 2006.

See also
 List of One Day International cricket umpires
 List of Twenty20 International cricket umpires

References

1964 births
Living people
South African One Day International cricket umpires
South African Twenty20 International cricket umpires
Sportspeople from Port Elizabeth